Archibald McIndewar (26 July 1921 – 13 October 2004) was a Scottish footballer who played for Queen's Park, Rangers and Dumbarton.

References

External links

1921 births
Scottish footballers
Queen's Park F.C. players
Rangers F.C. players
Dumbarton F.C. players
Scottish Football League players
2004 deaths
Dundee United F.C. players
Stirling Albion F.C. players
Workington A.F.C. players
English Football League players
Association football goalkeepers